Grey's mudsnake (Ephalophis greyae), also known commonly as the mangrove seasnake, is a species of venomous snake in the subfamily Hydrophiinae of the family Elapidae. The species is endemic to northwestern Australia.

Etymology
Its specific name, greyae, has also been spelled greyi; however, it was named after a Beatrice Grey who collected the holotype, necessitating a feminine possessive.

Reproduction
E. greyae is viviparous.

References

Further reading
Cogger HG (2014). Reptiles and Amphibians of Australia, Seventh Edition. Clayton, Victoria, Australia: CSIRO Publishing. xxx + 1,033 pp. .
Smith MA (1931). "Description of a new genus of sea-snake from the coast of Australia, with a note on the structures providing for complete closure of the mouth in aquatic snakes". Proc. Zool. Soc. London, Second Series 1931: 397-398. (Ephalophis greyi, new species).
Shea, Glenn M. (1996). "Correction of the incorrect original spelling of the species name of a Hydrophiid snake". The Snake 27 (2): 157. (Ephalophis greyae, new spelling).

Elapidae
Snakes of Australia
Reptiles described in 1931
Monotypic snake genera